Ramsey North railway station was a railway station in Ramsey, Cambridgeshire which is now closed.
It was the terminus of a branch line from Holme on the East Coast main line run by the Great Northern Railway.

History

The station opened on 22 July 1863, as the terminus of the Ramsey Railway, a branch line from Holme on the Great Northern Railway (GNR). The trains were worked by the GNR.

The branch from Holme remained physically isolated from the rest of the GER system, and so the GER leased it to the GNR which continued to work it.

On 1 January 1923 the GNR and the GER became constituents of the London and North Eastern Railway (LNER), which found itself with two stations in Ramsey; they were given new names on 1 July 1923, the ex-Ramsey Railway station becoming Ramsey North.

The station closed to passengers on 6 October 1947 and to freight in December 1973. Ramsey Auction Rooms now occupy the former site.

Route

References

External links
 Ramsey North station on navigable 1946 O. S. map
 Ramsey North station on Subterranea Britannica

Disused railway stations in Cambridgeshire
Former Great Northern Railway stations
Railway stations in Great Britain opened in 1863
Railway stations in Great Britain closed in 1947
Ramsey, Cambridgeshire